Gizay is a commune in the Vienne department in the Nouvelle-Aquitaine region in western France. The inhabitants are called Gizayens.

Sights
Château de Chambonneau

See also
Communes of the Vienne department

References

Communes of Vienne